Rebekka Carlsen (born 1 September 1999) is a Norwegian table tennis player. Her highest career ITTF ranking was 301.

References

1999 births
Living people
Norwegian table tennis players